Marko Milunović (born 10 September 1986) is a professional Serbian footballer who plays as a forward for Tatran Prešov.

References

External links
 MFK Skalica official club profile
 
 Futbalnet profile
 Eurofotbal profile

1986 births
Living people
Serbian footballers
Association football forwards
FK BSK Borča players
FK Kolubara players
OFK Mladenovac players
MFK Tatran Liptovský Mikuláš players
Partizán Bardejov players
MFK Skalica players
ŠKF Sereď players
Stal Rzeszów players
FK Humenné players 
1. FC Tatran Prešov players 
Expatriate footballers in Slovakia
Serbian expatriate sportspeople in Slovakia
Expatriate footballers in the Czech Republic
Serbian expatriate sportspeople in the Czech Republic
Expatriate footballers in Poland
Serbian expatriate sportspeople in Poland
2. Liga (Slovakia) players
3. Liga (Slovakia) players
III liga players